Sangojla  is a village in Kapurthala district of Punjab State, India. The village is administrated by a Sarpanch, who is an elected representative.

Demography 
According to the report published by Census India in 2011, Sangojla has total number of 356 houses and population of 1,767 of which include 893 males and 874 females. Literacy rate of Sangojla is 72.74%, lower than state average of 75.84%.  The population of children under the age of 6 years is 186 which is 10.53% of total population of Sangojla, and child sex ratio is approximately 842, lower than state average of 846.

Population data

Air travel connectivity 
The closest airport to the village is Sri Guru Ram Dass Jee International Airport.

Villages in Kapurthala

References

External links
  Villages in Kapurthala
 Kapurthala Villages List

Villages in Kapurthala district